Margaret Elizabeth Ray , née Vercoe (15 July 1933 – 31 May 2017) was an Australian politician.

She was born in Melbourne to Edward Leslie Vercoe, a Methodist minister, and Thelma Alice Tickner. She attended state schools and then Melbourne University, where she acquired a Bachelor of Arts (Honours) and a Diploma of Education and became a schoolteacher. She taught at Wangaratta from 1956 to 1957 and at Greythorn High School from 1968 to 1981.

She joined the Labor Party in 1971 and held a number of positions including president of the Blackburn branch. In 1982 she was elected to the Victorian Legislative Assembly as the member for Box Hill. She held the seat until her defeat in 1992.

Following her political career, Ray was mostly involved in the Uniting Church, including as chair of the congregation at St David's Uniting Church in Canterbury.

She was appointed a Member of the Order of Australia in 2004.

References

1933 births
2017 deaths
Australian Labor Party members of the Parliament of Victoria
Members of the Victorian Legislative Assembly
Members of the Order of Australia
Philanthropists from Melbourne
Women members of the Victorian Legislative Assembly
University of Melbourne alumni politicians
Australian schoolteachers